The Constitution of the Republic of the Union of Myanmar (2008) is the third Constitution of Myanmar after 1947 and 1974 constitutions which lost force after military coups. It is part of the seven steps road map announced by then Prime Minister of State Peace and Development Council government General Khin Nyunt on 30 August 2003. One of the seven steps include recalling the National Convention for the drafting of new constitution. The National Conventions was adjourned on 31 March 1996 by State Law and Order Restoration Council government.

The convention began on 17 May 2004 and was attended by 1076 of invited delegates and representatives from 25 ethnic ceasefire groups. After several sessions, the convention concluded with the adoption of fundamental principles for a 54-member constitution drafting commission, which was later formed by the SPDC. On 19 February 2008, the SPDC announced that the commission had finalised the drafted constitution and planned to hold a referendum in May 2008.

On 10 May 2008 (24 May 2008 in some townships), the 2008 constitutional referendum was held in Myanmar, and the SPDC announced 93.82% of the voters voted for the constitution. However, there has been widespread criticism of the process as the Cyclone Nargis hit Myanmar a few days before the referendum and questions about whether the overall process was free and fair.

The 2008 Constitution came into force on 31 January 2011. 

The Tatmadaw (Myanmar Armed Forces) retained significant control of the government under the 2008 constitution. 25% of seats in the Parliament of Myanmar were reserved for serving military officers. The ministries of home, border affairs and defense had to be headed by a serving military officer. The military also appoints one of the country's two vice presidents. Hence, the country's civilian leaders have little influence over the security establishment.

See also
Constitution of Myanmar – contains significant information about the 2008 Constitution
2015 Myanmar constitutional referendum – proposed amendments that did not proceed

References

External links

 "Constitution of the Republic of the Union of Myanmar (2008)" Official English version

Constitution
Law of Myanmar
Constitutions by country
Military dictatorship in Myanmar